Sault Area High School and Career Center (SAHS) is a public, magnet high school in Sault Ste. Marie, Michigan. It serves grades 9–12. It is a part of Sault Area Public Schools.

In 2022 Jeanine Sherman became the principal.

Demographics 
The demographic breakdown of the 734 students enrolled in 2018-19 was:

 Male - 51.9%
 Female - 48.1%
 Native American - 35.0%
 Asian - 1.1%
 Black - 0.7%
 Hispanic - 1.4%
 Pacific Islander - 0.4%
 White - 60.8%
 Multiracial - 0.7%

In addition, 48.4% of students were eligible for reduced-price or free lunch

References

External links 

 Official school district website
 High school website

Education in Chippewa County, Michigan
Public high schools in Michigan
Sault Ste. Marie, Michigan